Liolaemus bellii is a species of lizard in the family  Liolaemidae. It is native to Chile.

References

bellii
Reptiles described in 1845
Reptiles of Chile
Taxa named by John Edward Gray
Endemic fauna of Chile